The Kristianstad Basin is a Cretaceous-age structural basin and geological formation in northeastern Skåne, the southernmost province of Sweden. The sediments in the basin preserves a wide assortment of taxa represented in its fossil record, including the only non-avian dinosaur fossils in Sweden and one of the world's most diverse mosasaur faunas.

Though a majority of the taxa listed below lived during the latest early Campanian ( 80.5 million years ago; fossils from the site Ivö Klack alone from this time compromise about 40 vertebrate species and more than 200 invertebrate species), the Kristianstad Basin preserves fossils ranging in age from the early Santonian ( 86.3 million years ago) to the early Maastrichtian ( 72.1 million years ago); some of the animals in the list were not contemporaries, but separated from each other in time by several million years. The time spans from which fossils have been recovered is included for each species in the list.

Bony fish

Ray-finned fish

Cartilaginous fish

Sharks

Holocephali

Rays

Crocodylomorphs 
In addition to the remains referred to Aigialosuchus, detached and unidentified crocodylomorph scutes have also been discovered in Campanian-age deposits at Ivö Klack.

Dinosaurs

Non-avian dinosaurs

Birds 
In addition to the fossils described below, indeterminate hesperornithiform remains have also been recovered from Åsen.

Mosasaurs

Plesiosaurs 
The last comprehensive review of the plesiosaur fauna in the Kristianstad Basin was done by paleontologist Per-Ove Persson in the 1960s and his taxonomy is still used with caution, pending a much-needed new review.

Pterosaurs 
Possible pterosaur bone fragments have been recovered from earliest Campanian-age deposits at Ullstorp, though they remain unpublished.

Scincomorpha 
Fossils of terrestrial scincomorph lizards have been recovered in the Kristianstad Basin, but are as of yet unpublished.

Turtles 
In addition to the fossils described below, indeterminate turtle remains, including limb bones and carapace fragments, have also been recovered from Ivö Klack, Ugnsmunnarna, Ignaberga and Åsen.

Invertebrates 
Note: Although the Kristianstad Basin is incredibly rich in invertebrate fossils and diversity, with hundreds of species, the creation of a full list is impossible due to a lack of published overviews and recent examinations. Which lists are incomplete is specified below and estimates in regards to how many species are actually present are included if possible.

Bivalves 
The bivalves are the most species-rich group present in the Kristianstad Basin, with Surlyk & Sørenson (2010) stating that close to 70 distinct species were present at Ivö Klack alone.

Brachiopods 
According to Surlyk & Sørenson (2010) there were 27 distinct species of brachiopods present at Ivö Klack alone.

Bryozoans 
Fossils of bryozoans are common in several sites throughout the Kristianstad Basin.

Cephalopods

Belemnites

Ammonites 
According to Surlyk & Sørenson, a large species of ammonite is also known from Ivö Klack.

Chitons

Corals 
Fossils of corals are common in several sites throughout the Kristianstad Basin. The list below only accounts for the recently revised diversity of corals found at Ivö Klack.

Crinoids 
Fossils of crinoids have been found at several sites throughout the Kristianstad Basin.

Crustaceans

Echinoids 
According to Surlyk & Sørenson (2010) there were 18 distinct species of echinoids present at Ivö Klack alone.

Gastropods 
According to Surlyk & Sørenson (2010), 19 species of gastropods could be identified from fossils just from the latest Early Campanian of Ivö Klack. Their subsequent 2011 study on the gastropods of the site only listed the 15 species accounted for below.

Polychaetes 
In addition to the diverse polychaete worm fauna of Ivö Klack listed below, encrusters of serpulid polychaetes have also been discovered at Åsen, though they are considerably fewer in number there and as of yet unpublished.

Sponges 
Fossil sponges have been recovered at fossil sites in the Kristianstad Basin.

Starfish 
Fossils of starfish have been found at several sites in the Kristianstad Basin. According to Surlyk & Sørenson (2010) there were 16 distinct species of starfish present at Ivö Klack alone.

See also
 List of fossil sites (with link directory)
 List of dinosaur-bearing rock formations
 Paleobiota of the Niobrara Formation

References

Citations

General bibliography

Web sources 

 
 
 
 
 
 
 

Campanian life
Cretaceous Sweden
Maastrichtian life
Prehistoric biotas
Prehistoric fauna by locality
Santonian life